Hajji Baghlu (also Romanized as Ḩājjī Bāghlū and Ḩājjībāghlū) is a village in Hasanlu Rural District, Mohammadyar District, Naqadeh County, West Azerbaijan Province, Iran. At the 2006 census, its population was 61, in 15 families.

References 

Populated places in Naqadeh County